The 2014–2018 Nicaraguan protests were a series of protests against President of Nicaragua Daniel Ortega and actions performed by his government, the dismantling of the opposition, and violence against peaceful protesters. The protests began in 2014, when the construction of the Nicaragua Canal was about to begin, and several hundred protesters blocked roads and clashed with police during the groundbreaking of the canal. Tens of thousands of Nicaraguans began to protest against President Ortega for what they believe to be a corrupt electoral system.

The protests were renewed in April 2018 following the Ortega administration's decree of the Nicaraguan Social Security Institute's social security reform increasing taxes and decreasing benefits. Police and the paramilitary groups attacked and killed unarmed protesters, which made people to stand-up. After five days of deadly unrest, Ortega announced the cancellation of the reforms. Since then, Ortega faced the largest protests in his government's history, with the protest movement spreading to denounce Ortega in general and demanding his resignation. Related protests continued in 2018 and thereafter.

Background
In 2014, Steven Levitsky of Harvard University stated: "Only under the dictatorships of the past ... were presidents reelected for life", with Levitsky further saying that while Latin America experienced democracy, citizens opposed "indefinite reelection, because of the dictatorships of the past." About Nicaragua, Levitsky stated: "In Nicaragua ... reelection is associated with the same problems of 100 years ago." That same year, The Washington Post stated that "Daniel Ortega of Nicaragua ... used the ballot box to weaken or eliminate term limits."

Early in Ortega's presidency, he allied with Venezuelan President Hugo Chávez and his regional block which provided $500 million in oil subsidies annually to Ortega's government. Critics stated that the subsidies worked as a slush fund and helped President Ortega maintain political strength. Going into the 2010s, Venezuela began to experience economic difficulties. On 15 June 2013, President Ortega announced that his government was partnering with Chinese billionaire Wang Jing to construct the Nicaraguan Canal, a plan to construct a canal through Lake Nicaragua and the surrounding area that the Nicaraguan government claimed would benefit the economy of the country. Sergio Ramírez, a former vice president of President Ortega, "suspected Ortega of using the canal to keep himself in office and also, possibly, to enrich himself", with Ramírez stating that "Ortega wants to make it appear that his tenure in power is indispensable in order to consummate this long-term project."

According to the Business-Anti-Corruption Portal, corruption among political circles within the Nicaraguan government "impairs the functioning of state institutions and limits foreign investment", while multinational companies "report widespread favouritism and impunity among public officials." The Business Anti-Corruption Portal added that "[t]he protection of property rights is weak due to public authorities' failure to enforce court orders." Many campesinos near the canal's path began to protest against President Ortega and the plan due to the Chinese firm's ability to expropriate their land, possibly displacing over 100,000 Nicaraguans. Such expropriations were granted by President Ortega's government in 2013 after only three hours of debate, allowing HKND, the developer of the canal, power to confiscate any property it needs in Nicaragua. Some Nicaraguans believed that President Ortega gave up Nicaragua's sovereignty and environment to the Chinese, with one newspaper reminding Nicaraguans that in 2007, President Ortega stated that he would not risk Lake Nicaragua's stability "for all the gold in the world."

Timeline of events

2014

December

Protests began on 24 December 2014 with clashes ensuing, with campesino protesters being arrested and allegedly beaten by Nicaraguan authorities, with 47 of the protesters and their leaders being arrested. It was reported that the government was searching each home in the area to find those who participated in the protests. On 26 December, protesters demonstrated outside of El Chipote Prison and were confronted by Sandinista Youth on motorcycles, with some protesters being released later that day. On 30 December 6 of the campesino leaders were released from El Chipote Prison.

Members of the Independent Liberal Party also began protesting every Wednesday demanding electoral law reforms. According to Nicaraguan sociologist Manuel Ortega Hegg, the protests against President Ortega "involve a wider range of groups, like campesinos" who were formally allied with Ortega, along with "many who are sympathetic to the government", noting that those who are demonstrating are from "beyond political parties." He further states that since Nicaraguans were left out of the dialogue, that "their only recourse is to take to the streets."

2015

January

In Ometepe, residents greeted a Nicaraguan government medical team with a banner that read "Traitor Ortega, no more lies", with activists in the area stating that the medical team only wanted their identification numbers so they could show that "you're in favor of the canal."

June
On 14 June, thousands of Nicaraguans protested with about 15,000 and 30,000 demonstrating in Juigalpa. The protest consisted mostly of "peasants" with organizers surprised that the number of protesters was larger than the 10,000 they had anticipated.

July
On 8 July, about 200 protesters in Managua demonstrated against what they called electoral rules that "favours Ortega's Sandinista party." Clashes then erupted between authorities and protesters when protesters grew close to the electoral offices, with police beating protesters and journalists, breaking one Associated Press photographer's camera lens. About nine lawmakers from the Independent Liberal Party were also arrested and later released. On 15 July, the weekly protest in Managua was attended by about 300 protesters, with not only the Independent Liberal Party participating but members of the Sandinista Renovation Movement, among others upset with government actions. Multiple buses full of protesters destined to participate at the protest were also stopped by Nicaraguan authorities, with some individuals being temporarily detained.

2016
According to the Economist Intelligence Unit in their August 2016 Nicaragua: Country Outlook report, "management of rural protests, particularly those related to nascent plans for a transoceanic canal, have damaged his support, and complaints about a lack of accountability and transparency in government will intensify."

January
The 56th protest occurred on 9 January, with hundreds of farmers gathered in La Fonseca, demanding that Law 840, the law that granted the construction of the Nicaragua Canal, be revoked. The collection of signatures representing the dissatisfaction with the canal also took place during the demonstrations.

April
On 22 April, thousands of Nicaraguans protested in Managua, with Jose Chavarria, a farmers group leader, stating that protesters would continue to fight the Nicaragua Canal.

June

Two United States diplomats and a professor were expelled from Nicaragua on 14 June due to their studies on the canal, with President Ortega stating, "Our government has been forced to remove two people who, being United States government officials with official passports, carried out in Nicaragua without the knowledge of or coordination with our authorities tasks that are the purview of the Nicaraguan government."

On 25 June, five foreign activists were deported for alleged possession of explosives after a small fire occurred at a home that was teaching about wood stoves.

The United States government then issued a travel warning to its own visitors on 29 June due to the Nicaraguan government's reactions to protest, which included the deportation and expulsion of foreign visitors.

November
On 29 November 2016, a protest destined to the capital city of Managua was met with roadblocks from Nicaraguan authorities. At the starting point  from Managua in Nueva Guinea, protests turned to clashes resulting in eleven injured.

2017

April
Police in the city of Juigalpa east of Managua prevented vehicles involved in protests from traveling on 22 April 2017, with at least 20 protesters arrested.

2018

February 
By February 2018, many analysts viewed the canal project as defunct, with the main investor having lost much of his fortune in the 2015–2016 economic crisis, and other Chinese investment having turned to focus on Panama, the Nicaragua project's main competitor. Nonetheless, the head of the canal authority in Nicaragua insisted work on the project was slow due to the project's size but still on-going. The Chinese company that had been granted the concession for the canal maintains legal rights to it and to side projects in the country, short of a 60% vote to revoke the legislation. As of August 2019, the project remained in a state of limbo.

April

On 16 April 2018, demonstrators marched in the capital of Managua to protest what they regarded as an insufficient government response to forest fires that burned  of the Indio Maiz Biological Reserve, a tropical nature preserve that is home to Rama and Kriol indigenous people, as well as significant biodiversity and endangered species. Counterprotests supported the Sandinista Front government.

On Wednesday, 18 April, protests in the capital expanded in response to the Ortega and Murillo administration announcement of social security reforms that raised income and payroll taxes while reducing pension benefits by 5%. Demonstrations also emerged in six more cities, meeting with heavy response from authorities following the deployment of the Nicaraguan Army to respond to protesters ordered by President Ortega. At least 26 people were killed, including journalist  of the news program Meridiano, with Gahona being shot to death outside of city hall in Bluefields while streaming on Facebook Live. Reports also emerged that various forms of independent media were censored during the protests.

On Saturday 21 April, Ortega made his first public appearance, announcing he would hold negotiations for possible revision of the reforms, planned to take effect 1 July; however, he said he would only meet with business leaders, and alleged that demonstrators were being manipulated by gangs and other political interests. Demonstrations increased in response, with protestors objecting to the repression of demonstrations and the exclusion of other sectors from the negotiations, as well as the reforms themselves. The business chamber Cosep announced it would only participate in the negotiation if police violence ceased, detained protestors were released and free speech was restored. Nicaragua's Roman Catholic Conference of Bishops also called for an end to the police violence and criticized unilateral reforms; Pope Francis subsequently added his call for peace in the country.

On Sunday, 22 April, as press described the unrest as the biggest crisis of Ortega's presidency, Ortega announced the cancellation of the social security reforms, acknowledging they were not viable and had created a "dramatic situation." He again proposed negotiations on the issue, this time to include Catholic Cardinal Leopoldo Brenes as well as the business community.

On Monday, 23 April, marches of citizens, businessmen and students were presented in Managua demanding the end of violence in the country as well as the release of students arrested by the police and the cessation of censorship of television media, in addition to ask for a response from the government about the students who died during the protests. The protests were the largest seen during the Ortega administration, with tens of thousands of Nicaraguans participating and calling for the resignation of Ortega.

On 24 April, over 200 detainees were released by Nicaraguan authorities. This was the result of dialogue between the government and other organizations.

By 26 April, it was reported that at least 63 people were killed, mostly by bullet wounds, with more than 160 injured by gunfire.

See also 

 List of protests in the 21st century
 2018–2021 Nicaraguan protests

References

 
2014 in Nicaragua
Nicaragua
2015 in Nicaragua
Nicaragua
2016 in Nicaragua
Nicaragua
2017 in Nicaragua
Nicaragua
2018 in Nicaragua
Nicaragua
2014-2018